Tayıflı  (also,  Tayifli, Taifly, Tayfliy, and Tayfly) is a village and municipality in the Oghuz Rayon of Azerbaijan.  It has a population of 613, 357 of whom vote. The village has a school named Tayıflı kənd orta məktəb (Tayifli village secondary school).

References 

Populated places in Oghuz District